Halazone (4-(dichlorosulfamoyl)benzoic acid) is a chemical compound whose formula can be written as either  or .  It has been widely used to disinfect drinking water.

Other names for this compound include p-sulfondichloramidobenzoic acid, 4-[(dichloroamino)sulfonyl]benzoic acid, and Pantocide.

Uses
Halazone tablets have been used to disinfect water for drinking, especially where treated tap water is not available.  A typical dosage is 4 mg/L.

Halazone tablets were commonly used during World War II by U.S. soldiers for portable water purification, even being included in accessory packs for C-rations until 1945.

Halazone has largely been replaced in that use by sodium dichloroisocyanurate.  The primary limitation of halazone tablets was the very short usable life of opened bottles, typically three days or less, unlike iodine-based tablets which have a usable open bottle life of three months.

Dilute halazone solutions (4 to 8 ppm of available chlorine) has also been used to disinfect contact lenses, and as a spermicide.

Mechanism of action
Halazone's disinfecting activity is mainly due to the hypochlorous acid released by hydrolysis of the chlorine-nitrogen bonds when the product is dissolved in water:
  +  →  + 
The hypochlorous acid is a powerful oxidizer and chlorinating agent that destroys or denatures many organic compounds.

Production

Halazone can be prepared by chlorination of p-sulfonamidobenzoic acid.

Another synthesis route is the oxidation of dichloramine-T with potassium permanganate in a mild alkaline medium.

See also
 Bleach
 Chlorine-releasing compound
 Chloramine-T (tosylchloramide sodium salt), another water disinfection agent.
 Water chlorination

References

Antiseptics and disinfectants
Benzoic acids
Sulfonamides